Bertram Shapleigh (15 January 1871 – 2 July 1940) was an American composer, heavily interested in the culture of Asia.

Education
He studied composition with G.E. Whiting and George Whitefield Chadwick at the New England Conservatory; graduating in 1891. He continued his studies with Edward MacDowell in the United States and spent some time studying in France and Germany as well. A man of wide interests, he entered the Vermont Medical College graduating with an MD degree in 1893.

Career
He became a lecturer on the arts, but a developing concern with South Asian music that led him to give his attention fully to music and to composition. He played the piano and cello, and gave lecture-recitals on music history, Eastern music and Wagner’s operas. In 1898 he left the United States for Europe, eventually settling in England in 1902. However, after his house, with his library of 7000 volumes, had been destroyed by fire, he returned to the USA in 1917, to serve as an adviser to Breitkopf & Härtel and editor of the Concert Exchange. He lectured widely, wrote for magazines and newspapers, published three books of poetry and a novel, and composed numerous pieces in various forms. His works are in a Romantic style, sometimes using themes and timbres imitative of Indian music.

Legacy
After his death in 1940, a Bertram Shapleigh Foundation was established in Washington, DC, and his manuscripts are deposited there. He wrote a number of orchestral works, some including choir; several operas; church music; many songs, and a string quartet, among other chamber works.

References

External links
 
 

1871 births
1940 deaths
American male classical composers
American classical composers
American opera composers
Male opera composers
Pupils of George Whitefield Chadwick